Let's Goal!: Barairo no Jinsei is the twelfth studio album by Japanese singer and songwriter Mai Kuraki. The album was released on August 14, 2019, by Northern Music. It is the follow-up to her 2018 album Kimi Omou: Shunkashūtō. The album was released on standard edition, fan club edition, and five limited editions, each of which includes lyric book of different designs. Let's Goal!: Barairo no Jinsei is a J-pop album, incorporating elements of R&B, rock, electropop and many other genres.

The album was supported by the double A-side single, "Kimi to Koi no Mama de Owarenai Itsumo Yume no Mama ja Irarenai" and "Barairo no Jinsei", which peaked at number four in Japan, becoming her forty-second consecutive top 10 single. To promote the album, the singer embarked on the national tour, "20th Anniversary Mai Kuraki Live Project 2019 "Let's Goal!: Barairo no Jinsei"" from August 17, 2019.　Upon release, Let's Goal!: Barairo no Jinsei debuted at number three on the Oricon Weekly Albums chart with  19,998 copies, becoming Kuraki's fifteenth top 10 album in Japan.

Release
On 15 April 2019, Kuraki announced the release of the new album, Let's Goal!: Barairo no Jinsei in the summer of the year. The release date of the album was revealed on 26 May 2019, at the meet and greet tour held at Venus Fort in Tokyo. On 31 July 2019, the snippets of the each track on the album was uploaded on Kuraki's official website. 

Let's Goal!: Barairo no Jinsei was released in the seven versions, standard edition, FC & Musing edition, and five limited editions, each of which represents the five rings of the Olympic symbols and the five corresponding continents: Europe, Asia, Africa, America, and Oceania. While the standard edition includes the bonus track, the limited editions was accompanied by the bonus disc which includes the cover of Zard's song, "Makenaide". Each limited edition was accompanied with the different design of lyric booklets.

Promotion

Singles
A double-A side single, "Kimi to Koi no Mama de Owarenai Itsumo Yume no Mama ja Irarenai"/"Barairo no Jinsei" was released as the lead single from the album on 20 March 2019. Both songs served as the theme song to the Japanese animated television series, Case Closed. The single was a commercial success, peaking at number four in Japan and selling over 37,000 copies nationwide.

Other songs 
"Shiawase no Tobira" was used on the television commercial for Cleverlyhome, in which Kuraki was starred.

"Makenaide" is a cover of Zard song, and was included exclusively on limited editions of Let's Goal!: Barairo no Jinsei. To promote the album, Kuraki performed the song on the television shows including Music Station and Best Artist 2019.

Tours

Meet and greet tour
In support of the album, Kuraki embarked on the meet and greet tour entitled 20 Shūnen Arigato! Medal Juyoshiki, which began on 25 May 2019 in Abeno-ku, Osaka.

Set list
This set list is from the show in Osaka on May 25, 2019. It may not represent all concerts for the duration of the tour.
"Kimi to Koi no Mama de Owarenai Itsumo Yume no Mama ja Irarenai"
"Shiawase no Tobira"
"Barairo no Jinsei"

20th Anniversary Mai Kuraki Live Project 2019 "Let's Goal!: Barairo no Jinsei"

The concert tour, entitled 20th Anniversary Mai Kuraki Live Project 2019 "Let's Goal!: Barairo no Jinsei" began on August 17, 2019 in support of the album. The show in Tokyo was recorded and released on a video album, 20th Anniversary Mai Kuraki Live Project 2019 "Let's Goal!: Barairo no Jinsei".

Set list
This set list is from the show in Tokyo on October 26, 2019. It may not represent all concerts for the duration of the tour.

"Love, Day After Tomorrow"
"Stay by My Side"
"Secret of My Heart"
"Delicious Way"
"Long Distance"
"Your Best Friend"
"Missing You"
"Tsumetai Umi"
"Tonight, I Feel Close to You" 
"Anata ga Irukara"
"Happy Days"
"Be Proud: We Make New History"
"Time After Time (Hana Mau Machi de)"
"Togetsukyo (Kimi Omou)"
"Kimi to Koi no Mama de Owarenai Itsumo Yume no Mama ja Irarenai"
"Let's Go!"
"Change"
"Sawage Life"
"Stand Up"
"Best of Hero"
"Feel Fine!"
"Barairo no Jinsei"
Encore
"Jump! Jump!"
"Shiawase no Tobira"
"Chance for You"
"Makenaide" 
"Always"

Tour dates

Cancelled show

Commercial performance
On August 13, Let's Goal!: Barairo no Jinsei debuted at number three on the Oricon Daily Albums Chart with 8,949 copies sold. It also debuted at number three on the Oricon Weekly Albums Chart, with 19,998 copies sold in its first week. The album has sold 29,451 copies and stayed on the chart for eleven weeks. The album was a commercial failure, becoming Kuraki's lowest-selling studio album.

Track listing

Personnel 

Kenichi Ide - producer, composer
Daisuke Nakamura - producer, composer
H-Wonder - producer, composer
Benbrick - producer
Akihito Tokunaga - producer, composer
Josef Larossi - producer, composer
Andreas Romdhane - producer, composer
Omega - producer, composer
Fernando Garibay - producer, composer
One Above - producer
Hiroshi Asai - producer
Mai Kuraki - executive producer, vocals, composer
Daiko Nakato - executive producer
Maana - backing vocals
Shinichiro Ohta - backing vocals
Kanna Inoue - backing vocals
All at Once - backing vocals
Yoshinobu Ohga - guitars
Tokiko T Nishimuro - chief director
Shun Sato - director
Takayuki Ichikawa - recording engineer, mixing
Masahiro Shimada - mastering
Tetsuo Sato - art director, designer
Hidemi Arai - art director, designer
Sunao Ohmori - photographer
Hitoko Gotoh - stylist
Keizo Kuroda - hair and makeup artist
Kaoru Chujo - visual contents
Hideyuki Kouno - print coordinator
Asumi Narita - creative coordinator
Miho Saito - artist and relation
Asako Watanabe - artist management
Manami Yoshita - artist management
Being, Inc. - media promotion, distribution
Toshinori Masuda - supervisor
Holly Mama - composer
Yukiko Kaneda - composer
Jeff Franzel - composer
Paul Carter - composer
Kanata Okajima - composer
Tamra Keenan - composer
Jake Torrey - composer
Benjamin Ingrosso - composer
Ramiro Padilla - composer
Nick Long - composer
Andrew Burford - composer

Charts

Daily charts

Weekly charts

Monthly charts

Release history

References

2019 albums
Mai Kuraki albums
Being Inc. albums
Japanese-language albums
Albums produced by Daiko Nagato